Tephritis arsenii is a species of tephritid or fruit flies in the genus Tephritis of the family Tephritidae.

Distribution
Armenia.

References

Tephritinae
Insects described in 2015
Diptera of Asia